Libertas (Latin for 'liberty' or 'freedom') is the Roman goddess and personification of liberty. 

Libertas may also refer to:

Places
 Libertas (island), of the Fjäderholmarna group, Sweden
 Libertas (star) or Xi Aquilae
 Mahlamba Ndlopfu, formerly Libertas, the residence of the President of South Africa
 Libertas, the home of Adam Tas (1668–1722) in the Cape Colony

Politics
 Libertas (Norway), a Norwegian libertarian business organisation
 Libertas Academica, an open access journal publisher 
 Libertas Institute (Utah), a think tank in the U.S.
 Libertas (monument), commemorating the Estonian War of Independence
 Libertas Institute (Ireland), an Irish lobby group who campaigned for "no" in the 2008 referendum
 Libertas.eu, a pan-European political party 2008–2010
Libertas (Czech Republic)
Libertas Estonia
Libertas France
Libertas Greece
Libertas Germany
Libertas Ireland
Libertas Italy
Libertas Latvia
Libertas Lithuania
Libertas Malta
Libertas Netherlands
Libertas Poland
Libertas Portugal
Libertas Slovakia
Libertas Spain
Libertas Sweden
Libertas United Kingdom

Sports
 A.C. Libertas, a Sanmarinese football club
 Libertas, a predecessor of Viareggio Calcio
 Libertas S.C., a predecessor of S.S. Cavese 1919
 P.G. Libertas, an Italian football club
 Libertas (cycling team) 1952–1967
 Libertas Acate-Modica, an Italian football club
 Libertas Liburnia Basket Livorno, an Italian basketball team 
 Libertas Pallacanestro Asti, an Italian basketball club 
 Libertas Trogylos Basket, an Italian basketball club

Other uses
 Libertas (film), a 2006 Croatian-Italian film 
 Liberty Film Festival 2004–2008, and the online continuation Libertas Film Magazine
 Marvell Libertas, an open source wireless driver
 Professional Business School of Higher Education LIBERTAS, in Croatia
 Libertas Schulze-Boysen (1913–1942), German aristocrat and resistance fighter

See also

Liberta (disambiguation)
Liberty (disambiguation)
Freedom (disambiguation)
 Libertas convoy, a humanitarian action during the siege of Dubrovnik in 1991
Republic of Ragusa, whose flag features "Libertas"